Arturo Enrique Sampay (1911 in Concordia, Entre Ríos – February 14, 1977 in La Plata), was an Argentine lawyer, constitutionalist and professor. He is considered the "father" of the Argentine Constitution of 1949.

Works 
 La crisis del Estado de derecho liberal-burgués, 1938
 La filosofía del Iluminismo y la Constitución argentina de 1853, 1944
 Introducción a la Teoría del Estado, 1951
 Constitución y pueblo, 1974
 Las constituciones de la Argentina entre 1810 y 1972 con introducción, 1975

Bibliography

See also 
 Justicialist Party

References 

1911 births
1977 deaths
People from Entre Ríos Province
National University of La Plata alumni
Argentine academics
20th-century Argentine lawyers
Burials at La Plata Cemetery